Forest – I See You Everywhere is a 2021 Hungarian drama film written and directed by Bence Fliegauf. The film stars Laura Podlovics, István Lénárt, Lilla Kizlinger, Zsolt Végh, László Cziffer, Juli Jakab and Ági Gubík.

The film had its worldwide premiere at the 71st Berlin International Film Festival in March 2021.

Cast
The cast include:
 Juli Jakab
 Laszlo Cziffer
 Lilla Kizlinger
 Zsolt Vegh
 Istvan Lenart
 Eszter Balla
 Natasa Kovalik
 Agi Gubik
 Mihaly Vig
 Felician Keresztes
 Eliza Sodro
 Terence Gabor Gelencser  
 Janos Fliegauf
 Peter Fancsikai
 Zoltan Pinter
 Laura Podlovics

Release
On February 11, 2021, Berlinale announced that the film would have its worldwide premiere at the 71st Berlin International Film Festival in the Berlinale Competition section, in March 2021.

References

External links
 

Hungarian drama films